Distal humeral fractures are a group of humerus fracture which includes supracondylar fractures, single condyle fractures, bi-column fractures and coronal shear fractures.

References

Musculoskeletal system